Robert Klein (10 December 1925 – 13 October 2000) was a German gymnast. He competed at the 1956 Summer Olympics in all artistic gymnastics events and finished in fifth place with the German team. Individually his best achievement was seventh place on the vault. He won two national titles on the rings, in 1955 and 1957.

References

1925 births
2000 deaths
German male artistic gymnasts
Gymnasts at the 1956 Summer Olympics
Olympic gymnasts of the United Team of Germany
20th-century German people